Sibnica is a village in the municipality of Rekovac, Serbia. According to the 2002 census, the village has a population of 234 people.

Notable people
Dragoslav Stepanović

References

External links 

 Levac Online
 Article about Sibnica
 Pictures from Sibnica

Populated places in Pomoravlje District